Under Suspicion is a 1930 American pre-Code drama film directed by A. F. Erickson and starring J. Harold Murray and Lois Moran. It was produced and distributed by the Fox Film Corporation.

Cast
J. Harold Murray - John Smith, aka Sir Robert Macklin
Lois Moran - Alice Freil
J. M. Kerrigan - Doyle
Marie Saxon - Suzanne
Lumsden Hare - Freil
George Brent - Inspector Turner
Erwin Connelly - Darby
Rhoda Cross - Marie
Vera Gerald - Ellen
Herbert Bunston - Major Manners

References

External links

poster

1930 films
Fox Film films
American aviation films
American black-and-white films
1930s action drama films
American action drama films
1930 drama films
1930s American films
1930s English-language films